Hattstatt is a commune in the Haut-Rhin department in Grand Est in north-eastern France. It lies in the arrondissement of Guebwiller in the historic region of Alsace and is on the  Alsatian wineroute (Route des vins d'Alsace).

Notable sights
Hattstatt is named after the family of Hattstatt, whose family seat, the Château Hattstatt, can still be seen as a ruin, which is near the ruin of Château de Haneck and Chateau de Schrankenfels (which lie in Soultzbach-les-Bains).

Partner
Hattstatt has been partnered with Wiggensbach since 1983.

See also
 Communes of the Haut-Rhin département

References

Communes of Haut-Rhin